The Appleyards is a British television soap opera for children, made and transmitted fortnightly by BBC Television from October 1952 to April 1957, from the BBC's Lime Grove Studios. It was produced and directed by Naomi Capon.

Transmitted live on a Thursday afternoon from 4:30 to 5 p.m. with a Sunday repeat (which was not usually a recorded repeat of the first show but the same cast repeating a live performance), the programme told the story of the Home Counties family Mr and Mrs Appleyard and their three children: John, Margaret, and Tommy. They were usually accompanied by their neighbour and best friend Ronnie Grant.

The last episode concluded with Mrs Appleyard sitting on a porter's trolley at the end of a railway platform with Tommy as she announced that, as most of the family were now grown up, it was time to end the series. It was of its time but also a groundbreaking family sitcom, popular with both adults and children alike but particularly the latter who saw it as an embodiment of their own family. The catchy light music signature tune came from the Chappell Record Library and was called "Looking Around" by Colin Smith (real name is Rhys Donald Lloyd Thomas), recorded by conductor Robert Farnon.

A reunion programme, "Christmas with the Appleyards", went out at Christmas 1960.

Archive status
In the show's first year (1952) the episodes were aired live and never recorded, thus no episodes from the 1952 season exist. From 1953, the episodes were telerecorded, but the BBC ended up wiping most of them. Only one episode (entitled "Family Treat" and originally aired on 29 December 1956) of the entire run of 68 exists in television archives as of 2017, and can be found on YouTube.

References

External links
 The Appleyards at Television Heaven

BBC television dramas
1950s British television soap operas
English-language television shows
1952 British television series debuts
1957 British television series endings
Lost BBC episodes
1950s British children's television series